Agladrillia aureola is a species of sea snail, a marine gastropod mollusc in the family Drilliidae.

Description
The length of the shell attains 12 mm.

Distribution
This species occurs in the Caribbean Sea off Venezuela.

References

 Fallon P.J. (2016). Taxonomic review of tropical western Atlantic shallow water Drilliidae (Mollusca: Gastropoda: Conoidea) including descriptions of 100 new species. Zootaxa. 4090(1): 1–363

External links
 

aureola
Gastropods described in 2016
Fauna of the Caribbean